The Hits Tour may refer to:

 The Hits Tour (Luis Miguel)
 The Hits Tour (Toni Braxton)